Vehilius is a genus of skippers in the family Hesperiidae.

Species
Recognised species include:
 Vehilius carasta Schaus, 1902
 Vehilius clavicula (Plötz, 1884)
 Vehilius inca (Scudder, 1872) - Inca skipper
 Vehilius labdacus (Godman, 1900)
 Vehilius limae (Lindsey, 1925)
 Vehilius putus Bell, 1941
 Vehilius seriatus (Mabille, 1891)
 Vehilius stictomenes (Butler, 1877)
 Vehilius vetula (Mabille, 1878)
 Vehilius warreni (Weeks, 1901)

References

Natural History Museum Lepidoptera genus database

Hesperiinae
Hesperiidae genera